Wotu is an endangered Austronesian language of South Sulawesi, Indonesia. It belongs to the Wotu–Wolio branch of the  Celebic subgroup.

References 

Wotu–Wolio languages
Languages of Sulawesi